"Real Gone" is a song written by Sheryl Crow and John Shanks for the 2006 Pixar film Cars. Crow's version of the song is the second single to the official soundtrack album to the film.

The song charted to No. 76 on the Billboard Pop 100, as well as No. 1 on the Billboard Bubbling Under Hot 100 singles chart.

According to the sheet music published at MusicNotes.com, the song is written in the key of C major (recorded a half-step lower in B major).

Charts

Certifications

Cover versions

Billy Ray Cyrus version

Country singer Billy Ray Cyrus covered the song for the album Disneymania 6. It was made into a music video directed by Trey Fanjoy. It was released as a digital single only on June 18, 2008, after being featured on the compilation album Country Sings Disney. The song is also available on his 2009 album Back to Tennessee.

Honor Society version
Pop rock band Honor Society also covered the song for Disneymania 7.

References

2006 singles
2008 singles
2010 singles
2020 singles
Sheryl Crow songs
Billy Ray Cyrus songs
Music videos directed by Trey Fanjoy
Songs written by Sheryl Crow
Songs written by John Shanks
Song recordings produced by Mark Bright (record producer)
A&M Records singles
Walt Disney Records singles
Lyric Street Records singles
2006 songs
Songs written for animated films

pt:Real Gone (canção)